Medefaidrin  is a Unicode block containing characters for the constructed script Medefaidrin which is used to write the constructed language of the same name.  The Medefaidrin language and script were created as a Christian sacred language by an Ibibio congregation in 1930s Nigeria.

Block

History
The following Unicode-related documents record the purpose and process of defining specific characters in the Medefaidrin block:

References 

Unicode blocks
Ibibio